The National Guard Defence Battalions or TEA were a paramilitary internal security organization active in Greece (especially Northern Greece) between 1948 and 1982, under the control of the Defence Ministry.

The TEA were formed in September 1948, in the midst of the Greek Civil War, by decision of the Hellenic Army General Staff. They were staffed by men of proven "anticommunist" credentials; this, however, meant that many former Nazi collaborators, fascists, and even criminals and thugs were admitted to the organization.

They were abolished in 1982 by the socialist government of Andreas Papandreou, and replaced by the National Guard.

See also
 Security Battalions
 Operation Gladio

References

1948 establishments in Greece
1982 disestablishments in Greece
Paramilitary organizations based in Greece
Anti-communism in Greece
History of Greece (1949–1974)